Kelvington Airport  is located  south of Kelvington, Saskatchewan, Canada.

See also 
List of airports in Saskatchewan

References 

Registered aerodromes in Saskatchewan
Sasman No. 336, Saskatchewan